The Special Investigation Committee of Anti-National Activities ( abbreviated 반민특위) was established by the Constituent National Assembly to investigate those who actively cooperated with the Japanese Empire during the Japanese colonial period and conducted viciously anti-ethnic acts. There is one special committee.

The Constituent Assembly passed the Anti-People of Punishment Act on September 7, 1948, to punish those who actively cooperated in the robbery of sovereignty, independence activists under Japanese imperialism, or those who violently killed or persecuted their families. The anti-communist clouded the national period by using the special police station under its ambition, arresting Park Heung-sik, a bad entrepreneur of the Japanese colonial era, and Choi Nam-sun and Yi Kwang-su, who defended the Japanese people and brought them to the battlefield. Many of the pro-Japanese students who had been found were searched.

Due to the systematic disturbance of the Syngman Rhee regime, which used the pro-Japanese factions after the liberation, the activities of the anti-citizens were sluggish, and on 6 June 1949, the Special Police Forces were forced to disband. The parliamentary midterm will shorten special periods.

References

First Republic of Korea